"¿Qué Tengo Que Hacer?" is the third single by Daddy Yankee from the soundtrack Talento de Barrio released on 19 January 2009. The remix was released in March 2009, in which Daddy Yankee and Jowell & Randy use the Auto-tune effect in their respective verses. It received a nomination for Latin Rhythm Airplay Song of the Year at the 2010 Latin Billboard Music Awards.

Remix
"¿Qué Tengo Que Hacer?" feat. Jowell & Randy – 3:53
"¿Qué Tengo Que Hacer?" feat. Omega "El Fuerte" (Mambo Version) – 5:21

Music video
The music video features Daddy Yankee singing on a tropical beach in St. Thomas in the United States Virgin Islands. Beautiful scenery and beautiful women serve as a backdrop for the video. The video for the remix features scenes from the original video with new scenes featuring Jowell & Randy.

Charts

Certifications

External links
¿Qué Tengo Que Hacer? Official Music Video
¿Qué Tengo Que Hacer? (Remix) Official Music Video

References 

Spanish-language songs
Daddy Yankee songs
2009 singles
Songs written by Daddy Yankee
Jowell & Randy songs
Omega (singer) songs
2008 songs